Theodore Goldsmith Joslin (February 28, 1890 – April 12, 1944) was the second White House Press Secretary under President Herbert Hoover from 1931 until 1933.

Background
Joslin was born in Leominster, Massachusetts, to Frederick A. and Hanna Hopgood Joslin.  After graduating from high school, he took a job with the Boston bureau of the Associated Press (AP), rising from office boy to correspondent. In 1913 he joined the staff of the Boston Evening Transcript. In 1916 the Evening Transcript sent him to its Washington, D.C. bureau, and he became chief correspondent in 1924. From 1916 to 1931 he was also on the staff of World’s Week and contributed to other magazines. He married Rowena A. Hawes in 1913, and had two sons, Richard and Robert.

White House Press Secretary
In March 1931 Joslin was appointed press secretary to President Herbert Hoover, replacing George Akerson, who had taken the blame for the president's deteriorating relations with the Washington press corps. Joslin held that post until Hoover left office in March 1933. After his White House tenure, he produced Washington reports for the statistician Roger W. Babson from 1933–1936. He tehn served as president of The News-Journal Company of Wilmington, Delaware from 1936-1939. In 1939, he became director of public relations for the DuPont Company, holding that post until he died in his office of a heart attack.

During his tenure as presidential press secretary, Joslin struggled to improve Hoover's public image. Hoover's distaste for the press and personal publicity, the collapse of the national economy in the Great Depression, and such public relations blunders as sending army troops on the Bonus Marchers in 1932, make is so Joslin did not accomplish this task. Joslin admired Hoover, and his diary recorded the president's conversations and other events inside the administration, as well as during Hoover's race for reelection, which he lost in a landslide to Franklin D. Roosevelt.

Later life and death
After Hoover left office, Joslin published an expurgated version of the diary as Hoover Off the Record (1934). Much of what he omitted was later published by Timothy Walch and Dwight M. Miller in Herbert Hoover and Franklin D. Roosevelt: A Documentary History (1998). He died in 1944.

References
Joslin’s obituary appeared in the New York Times on April 13, 1944.
Louis W. Liebovich, Bylines in Despair: Herbert Hoover, the Great Depression, and the U.S. News Media (1994).
[Drew Pearson and Robert S. Allen] Washington Merry-Go-Round (1931).

External links

|-

1890 births
1944 deaths
White House Press Secretaries